Zobellella endophytica is a Gram-negative, non-spore-forming, rod-shaped, aerobic and motile bacterium from the genus of Zobellella which has been isolated from the roots of the plant Phragmites communis from the Kumtag Desert.

References 

Aeromonadales
Bacteria described in 2018